The 1909 Provence earthquake occurred on June 11 in Provence. Measuring 6.2 on the surface wave magnitude scale, it is the largest ever recorded earthquake in metropolitan France.

A total of 46 people died, another 250 were injured, and approximately 2,000 buildings were damaged.

The most damaged communes were Salon-de-Provence, Vernègues, Lambesc, Saint-Cannat and Rognes.

Fourteen people died in Rognes, which was half destroyed, especially the houses on the flanks of the hill Le Foussa. People were relocated under tents on another hill (Le Devin) and near the primary school. The main shock occurred at 9:15pm. If the earthquake had happened an hour later, more people would have been in bed, and more casualties would have been recorded.

The Vernègues castle and most of the houses in Vernègues were destroyed. Two people died in the village, which was later rebuilt at a lower altitude.

See also 
 List of earthquakes in 1909
 List of earthquakes in France

References

Further reading

External links
 Website about the earthquake 
 Webpage about the earthquake 
 Pictures of the aftermath of the earthquake in Saint-Cannat

1909 Provence
Provence
Earthquake
Bouches-du-Rhône
June 1909 events
1909 disasters in France